South Korea (IOC designation:Korea) participated in the 1974 Asian Games held in Tehran, Iran from September 1, 1974 to September 16, 1974.

Medal summary

Medal table

Medalists

References

Korea, South
1974
Asian Games